The Palace of Beau-Séjour  is a 19th-century Portuguese manor house situated in the civil parish of São Domingos de Benfica, municipality of Lisbon.

History
In 1849, the Quinta das Louras (or Quinta das Loureiras) was acquired by D. Ermelinda Allen de Almeida (then Viscountess of Regaleira) from João Veríssimo de Barros Viana and his wife, D. Maria Inácia dos Santos. The name of the quinta (estate) was within a short time changed to Beau-Séjour; the house was constructed following purchase of the estate by the Viscountess, and featured a landscaped French formal garden.

In 1859, the estate was sold by D. Isabel Allen Palmeiro, Baroness of Regaleira (niece and heiress to the Viscountess), to António José Leite Guimarães, Baron of Glória (1806-1876). The Baron ultimately proceeded to repair the azulejos tiles (using tile from the Roseira tile factory). Following his death (1876), Beau-Séjour passed into the hands of his nephew and niece, José Leite Guimarães and Maria da Glória Leite. The Baron had made his fortune in Rio de Janeiro before returning to Portugal. The next few years would see an investment and artistic enrichment of the palácio—with contributions by Francisco Vilaça, Columbano, Rafael and Maria Augusta Bordalo Pinheiro—by his heirs.

In the 1930s, following the death of D. Maria da Glória Leite, Beau-Séjour passed into the hands of her goddaughter and her husband (Augusto Fernandes de Almeida). Ultimately, most of the contents were sold at auction, along with the estate, which came into the possession of the Marist Brothers, who established a college in the palácio. This was a short-lived venture, after which the municipal council of Lisbon eventually acquired the estate in the 1980s. There were alterations to the interior of the house, conforming to the change in the function of the building: there was a subdivision of internal spaces, between the two towers on the first floor, including updated wallpaper on the walls. In addition, the azulejo tiles in the kitchen were replaced with adhesive plastic, and the garden's greenhouse was rebuilt, initially from wooden slats.

Between 1989 and 1992, work was undertaken to restore the building by the municipal council of Lisbon, under the direction of architect Jorge Matos Alves, with the objective of adapting Beau-Séjour for the municipal agency concerned with the study of Lisbon heritage, the GEO (Gabinete de Estudos Olisiponenses). This included the restoration of deteriorated elements of the architecture of the building: expanding the rooms, transforming the basement into a library/archive, and dividing the pantry space into two washrooms.  On the first floor a metal staircase was installed in the east wing and the attic was expanded, particularly in the north section. Attempts were made to restore the ceiling paintings (in the gold hall, dining room, music room and gallery), in addition to ceramic panels and dining room light fixture, a work by Rafael Bordalo Pinheiro. Other repairs included painting the walls, doors and window frames and restoration of the decorative stucco on the ceilings and the crown moulding. Frames and awnings of the old games room were replaced and the patio around the palácio was repaved. Meanwhile, landscape architect Luisa Ferraz (commissioned by the Lisbon city council) began to restore the plant species, and re-establish the paths and circulatory routes, based on the old photographs of Beau-Séjour. At the same time, the small building constructed by the Marist Brothers was demolished (thereby leaving the small fern-encircled waterfall unrestricted), while the doorway to the Estrada de Benfica in the wall was unblocked. In 1992, the GEO occupied and installed their offices in the building following extensive renovation work.

On 20 February 2014, the perimeter of the estate was altered, and it was classified to include only the residence and walled garden, which led to a change in the official designation; the classification was limited to the part of the estate consisting of  around the house (Dispatch 132/2014; Diário da República, Série II, 36).

Architecture
The estate with its longitudinal residence plan is composed of articulated volumes covered in roofing tile, that includes two-storey lateral wings and central single-storey main body decorated in blue azulejo tile. Along with the lateral wings, the two-storey high building is encircled by a patio and includes bow windows (semi-circular bay windows) on the second level. On the central rectangular portion are seven Gothic-style  French doors, surmounted by a semi-circular pediment. The Baron of Glória extensively remodelled the palácio, in the Art Nouveau style that included the elaborate azulejo tiles over the facade, along with Moorish features.  Various sculptures were scattered through the garden.

The plan of the Beau Séjour house is organized along two axes: the first, dominant, is the corridor that extends east to west, with two staircases to the first floor wings. The second axis (oriented north to south), front to rear, is created by two vestibules, the principal and posterior, connected by a corridor. The first floor of the wings comprise two connected spaces.

On the ground floor the reception area for the Gabinete de Estudos Olisiponenses is in the former living room of the palácio, and GEO workspaces are in the former library and in a dressing room connected to the former bedroom, within the bow window. The old gallery and painting rooms were transformed into the GEO library catalogue room (decorated by Francisco Vilaça in the Renaissance style that included the painted ceiling of the allegories of painting and sculpture). The former Golden Hall/Salon is the most notable space in the house, and includes the grand tapestry by Columbano Bordalo Pinheiro, "O Carnaval de Veneza", that is today used for the library reading rooms. The old music room (with decoration inspired by classical mythology) was also transformed into a reading room and decorated by Francisco Vilaça, who executed stuccos of musical instruments. A small vestibule that led to the old dining room is decorated by a grand ceramic panel created by Rafael Bordalo Pinheiro and executed by the Fábrica de Faianças in Caldas da Rainha, that includes a small fountain. The former dining room was decorated by the three Bordalo Pinheiro brothers: Columbano (who covered the walls with tiles which were later sold at auction), Rafael (a ceramic lamp and crown moulding, decorated with vegetal forms); and Maria Augusta (an L-shaped panel painted in floral patterns in the ceiling corners). The former dining room has been converted into a conference and exposition hall, along with the window-lined former games room.

The garden, that extends from the palace toward the Estrada de Benfica, is a miniature Romantic garden. This includes an irregular large reflecting pool, that is navigable and includes a small island connected by metal bridges. On this island is a metal shelter from the rain, similar to two others in the garden: one, a smaller shelter, similar to that on the island and another building in masonry situated alongside the wall, that acted as a porch to the Estrada de Benfica.

Following all the renovations and remodelling, the palácio acquired one of the largest collections of Portuguese Romantic and naturalist art and the grounds were opened to the public.

References

Notes

Sources
 
 
 
 
 
 
 

Palaces in Lisbon
Historic house museums in Portugal
Art Nouveau architecture in Portugal
Art Nouveau houses
Palace Beau Sejour